Milton Keynes in England has a collection of modern art, primarily sculpture, in its public buildings and open spaces.

Public art
The Milton Keynes Development Corporation had an ambitious public art programme and over 50 works were commissioned, mostly still extant. This programme also had two strands: a populist one which involved the local community in the works, the most famous of which is Liz Leyh's Concrete Cows, a group of concrete Friesian cows which have become the unofficial logo of the town.

There is also a tradition of abstract geometrical art hanging in the Midsummer Arcade of the Shopping Building, Central Milton Keynes. One such piece is Lilliane Lijn's "Circle of Light", though its mechanism has not worked for many years.

In Netherfield Park, Peter Codling's 2003 "Alphabet Artworks" are based on the 26 letters of the English (Latin) alphabet.

External links
 Milton Keynes Art Walks

References

Milton Keynes
Arts in Buckinghamshire